Marœuil is a commune in the Pas-de-Calais department in the Hauts-de-France region of France.

Geography

History
First recorded as Maraculum around 680, then as Maroel in 1104, Maroeul in 1307 and finally as Marœuil in 1670. A church was first built here by St. Bertille around the year 697.

Population

Places of interest
 The church of St.Bertille, dating from the nineteenth century.
 Two 18th century chapels.
 The Commonwealth War Graves Commission cemeteries.
 The remains of an ancient abbey, including underground passages.

Twin towns
 Menden, in Germany

See also
Communes of the Pas-de-Calais department

References

External links

 Official Web site 
 The CWGC cemetery
 The CWGC communal cemetery

Communes of Pas-de-Calais